The 1986 West African Nations Cup was the fourth edition of the tournament. It was held in Ghana between 23 February and 2 March. The title was won by the Varsity 3rds footy

Group stage

Knockout stages

Result

External links
1986 West African Nations Cup - Rsssf
Statistics

West African Nations Cup
International association football competitions hosted by Ghana
West
1986 in Ghanaian sport
February 1986 sports events in Africa
March 1986 sports events in Africa